Vincent Chang is an academic who was Vice-Chancellor and the inaugural President of BRAC University.

Education 
Chang received a B.Sc. in Electrical Engineering from National Taiwan University, an MPA from Harvard Kennedy School, and an MBA from Yale School of Management, a Ph.D. in Electrical Engineering and Computer Sciences from University of California, Berkeley and a second Ph.D. in Economics from Massachusetts Institute of Technology (MIT).

Career

Pre-academia 
Chang's pre-academia experiences, mainly in the US, included medical imaging, energy, investment, marketing and consulting, with start-up firms as well as JP Morgan, McKinsey, ExxonMobil and the US Federal Reserve.

Academic career 
Chang served as Executive Dean of Peking University HSBC Business School, established as China's first all-English International Business School. He was the Founding President and Planning Director of the University of Business and Technology in Oman (academically affiliated with Virginia Tech in the US), and the inaugural Associate Vice President for Institutional Development at Chinese University of Hong Kong, Shenzhen in China.

BRAC University 
Shortly after joining BRAC University in February 2019, Chang introduced BRAC University 2.0 as Bangladesh's international university and a research institution. He has three objectives for the university: internationalization, student life, and research with impact.
During his first year in office, he created the Graduate School of Management, School of Data and Sciences, School of Life Sciences, School of Humanities and Social Sciences, School of Architecture and Design, and School of General Education, in addition to the School of Engineering, School of Law, and School of Business. The School of Medicine is under planning.

In March 2019, Chang visited the Rohingya refugee camps, which are located in the vicinity of Cox's Bazar, near Myanmar. Over one million Rohingyas have taken refuge in the camps following a Myanmar military crackdown in Rakhine State in August 2017. He has since committed BRAC University to humanitarian research about the Rohingyas.

Following the visit, Chang supported the partnership between BRAC University's Centre for Peace and Justice and the International Institute of Social Studies (ISS). An International Conclave on Justice and Accountability for the Rohingyas was held in The Hague, Netherlands, on October 18, 2019. The Conclave opened up constructive debates around the Rohingya crisis.

Chang officially introduced BRAC University 2.0 on October 26, 2019 in the Foundation Stone Laying Ceremony for BRAC University's new campus. The founder of BRAC University, Sir Fazle Hasan Abed, KCMG laid the foundation stone.
In December 2019, Chang received the Bangladesh's national flag that was taken into space by Bangladesh's first Nano-Satellite BRAC Onnesha. The flag was delivered by the Japan Aerospace Exploration Agency. The satellite was developed by BRAC University School of Engineering's faculty and students. In January 2020, he mandated the Duke of Edinburgh Award Programme into BRAC University's student life curriculum. It is the first University in Bangladesh to make it an essential student experience.

Chang was instrumental in BRAC University's inaugural membership of the Open Society University Network. George Soros announced the University's involvement at the World Economic Forum in Davos, Switzerland, on 24 January 2020.

Under Chang's leadership, BRAC University ranked GLOBAL TOP 50 for 'Sustainable Development Goals (SDG 1): No poverty' in the Times Higher Education (THE) Impact Rankings 2020. BRAC University's performance has been found to be particularly encouraging in delivering the goals in the university's research on poverty and their support for poor students and citizens in the local community.

In response to the COVID-19 pandemic, Chang launched the Student Assistance Fund in May 2020. In June 2020, he launched BRAC University's online learning platform buX.
Chang was elected as a steering committee member of the Talloires Network of Engaged Universities in February 2021. The advisory body provides guidance for the network. The Talloires Network of Engaged Universities is a growing global coalition of presidents, vice-chancellors and rectors from 410 universities in 79 countries. The steering committee consists of 13 international members.

In a meeting with the President of Nepal, Bidya Devi Bhandari and the Prime Minister of Bhutan, Lotay Tshering in Dhaka in March 2021, Chang explained his vision on becoming an international institution.
The British High Commissioner to Bangladesh, Mr. Robert Chatterton Dickson joined Chang in the Orientation for Fall 2021 of BRAC University where the High Commissioner presented certificates of appreciation to recipients of 2021 Diana Award.

On May 10, 2022, Chang met with President Md. Abdul Hamid of Bangladesh at the President’s Office. During the meeting, Chang highlighted the importance of developing local human resources and how that can move Bangladesh’s economy to the next level.

Chang briefed President Hamid on BRAC University’s drive for research, international collaborations and student centric initiatives and updated on the University’s resilient response to Covid-19 and its growth even in this challenging time. President Hamid expressed his expectation to see BRAC University to lead by example in the higher education sector of Bangladesh. He briefed President Hamid on BRAC University’s drive for research, international collaborations and student centric initiatives and updated on the University’s resilient response to Covid-19 and its growth even in this challenging time.

President Hamid expressed his expectation to see BRAC University to lead by example in the higher education sector of Bangladesh.

On May 25, 2022, Chang and U.S. Ambassador to Bangladesh Peter Haas announced the partnership between U.S. Embassy and BRAC University on the resumption of the U.S. Fulbright Program in Bangladesh after six years of suspension. Chang said this is aligned with the three key development areas for the university, namely internationalization, research with impact, and student centricity.

References 

Year of birth missing (living people)
Living people
Vice-Chancellors of BRAC University
Harvard Kennedy School alumni
Yale School of Management alumni
UC Berkeley College of Engineering alumni
MIT School of Humanities, Arts, and Social Sciences alumni
Academic staff of the Chinese University of Hong Kong
Academic staff of Peking University